Alesya Kuznetsova (born 30 March 1992) is a Russian judoka. She is the 2017 European silver medalist in the 52 kg division

In 2019, she competed in the women's 52 kg event at the 2019 World Judo Championships held in Tokyo, Japan.

References

External links
 

1992 births
Russian female judoka
Living people
Universiade medalists in judo
Universiade gold medalists for Russia
Universiade bronze medalists for Russia
Medalists at the 2013 Summer Universiade
21st-century Russian women